Rise of the Phoenix, is the seventh and final album by Finnish metal band Before the Dawn, released on 27 April 2012, It is their second album released via Nuclear Blast Records, and unlike previous albums, does not include clean vocals. After the departure of Lars Eikind (clean vocals and bass) and Atte Palokangas (drums) in mid-2011, Tuomas started rehearsals with a new line-up consisting of lead guitarist Juho Räihä and new companions Pyry Hanski (bass) and Joonas Kauppinen (drums) to support Insomnium for the "One For Sorrow European Tour 2011", or as they called it "Rebirth Tour 2011" in November.

Background
On 8 February 2012, Tuomas released a video teaser of the album, followed by a second teaser on 21 March. A week later, the first single "Phoenix Rising" was released along with an official video. The second single "Pitch-Black Universe" was released with a video on 17 April.

Track listing

Charts

References

External links
 Before the Dawn official website Media page

2012 albums
Before the Dawn (band) albums